Pultenaea strobilifera is a species of flowering plant in the family Fabaceae and is endemic to the south-west of Western Australia. It is an open to dense, domed or spindly, erect shrub with simple leaves and yellow-orange and salmon pink to bright pink flowers.

Description
Flowering occurs from September to early November and the fruit is a flattened pod.

Taxonomy and naming
Pultenaea strobilifera was first formally described in 1844 by Carl Meissner in Lehmann's Plantae Preissianae from specimens collected by James Drummond. The specific epithet (strobilifera) means "pine-cone bearing".

Distribution and habitat
This pultenaea grows on plains, hills, sand dunes and swampy areas in woodland and heath in the Avon Wheatbelt, Esperance Plains, Jarrah Forest and Mallee biogeographic regions of south-western Western Australia.

Conservation status
Pultenaea strobilifera is classified as "not threatened" by the Government of Western Australia Department of Parks and Wildlife.

References

strobilifera
Eudicots of Western Australia
Plants described in 1844
Taxa named by Carl Meissner